Seth Michelson (born 1975), is an American poet, translator, and professor of poetry.

Background
He received his B.A. from Johns Hopkins University, his MFA in poetry from Sarah Lawrence College, and his Ph.D. in Comparative Literature from University of Southern California.

Poetry
He is the author of 16 volumes of original poetry, poetry in translation, and an anthology of poetry. 

He has been credited with "seeking transformation through opposition", with his poems having "at their core an acknowledgement of love—a love of family, love of language and poetry, love of music and nature. And it is through love that perhaps we can find the strength to face the greatest fears that lie ahead." 

His teaching, writing, and translations address injustice through compassion. This includes his translation of female poets and his work with incarcerated people. Of the latter, the scholar and critic Montse Feu writes, "Until Seth Michelson’s Dreaming America, though, no book had exclusively focused on the lives of the incarcerated children."

His most recent book of original poetry in English is Swimming Through Fire (2017), and it has been translated into Serbian as Plivanje kroz vatru (2020) by Vida Ognjenovic.

His most recent book of original poetry in Spanish is Rengo (2022).

His most recent book of poetry in translation is The Sun of Always (2022), and it is trilingual, featuring the poetry in Mapudungun, Spanish, and English.

Dreaming America
Michelson compiled, edited, and translated the poetry for the anthology Dreaming America: Voices of Undocumented Youth in Maximum-Security Detention (2017). Those poems come from poetry workshops that he created and led across three years inside the most restrictive immigrant detention center in the US for undocumented, unaccompanied youth.

The book is widely acclaimed, receiving praise in academic and public venues. It is regularly taught in high schools and universities, and it has been featured nationally and internationally in the press in places as diverse as ABC News, NPR, BBC, and la diaria of Uruguay. Dreaming America also has been featured at book festivals around the world, and it has been turned into original plays and music. All proceeds from its sale go to a legal defense fund for incarcerated, undocumented youth.

Translation
As a translator, Michelson focuses predominantly on poetry by women from Latin America. Thus, his books of poetry in translation include The Ghetto (2011; 2018) by the Argentine poet Tamara Kamenszain, The Red Song by the Uruguayan poet Melisa Machado, roly poly by the Uruguayan poet Victoria Estol, and Poems from the Disaster by the Argentine poet Zulema Moret.

He also earned a fellowship from the National Endowment for the Arts to translate poetry by the Mapuche poet Liliana Ancalao. That fellowship resulted in Women of the Big Sky (2020), the first-ever, single-author book of poetry by a female Mapuche writer from Argentina to appear in English-language translation. The book is in fact trilingual, featuring the poetry in Mapuzugun, Spanish, and English.

Outside of Latin America, Michelson has translated two books by the Indian poet Rati Saxena, Dreaming in Another Land (2014) and Scripted in the Streams (2017), and a book by the Israeli poet Amir Or, Wings (2018).

Teaching
Michelson currently teaches at Washington and Lee University in Lexington, Virginia, where he founded and directs the Center for Poetic Research.

Poetry
 Rengo (2022) 
 Swimming through Fire (2017) 
 Eyes Like Broken Windows (2012) 
 House in a Hurricane (2010)
 Kaddish for My Unborn Son (2009)
 Maestro of Brutal Splendor (2005)

Poetry in translation
 The Sun of Always by Liliana Ancalao, Puelmapu (2022) 
 Women of the Big Sky by Liliana Ancalao, Puelmapu (2020) 
 The Ghetto by Tamara Kamenszain, Argentina (2018) 
 Wings by Amir Or, Israel (2018) 
 The Red Song by Melisa Machado, Uruguay (2018) 
 Scripted in the Streams by Rati Sxena, India (2017)
 Poems from the Disaster by Zulema Moret, Argentina (2016) 
 roly poly by Victoria Estol, Uruguay (2014)
 Dreaming in Another Land by Rati Saxena, India (2014)
 El Ghetto/The Ghetto: A Bilingual Edition by Tamara Kamenszain, Argentina (2011)

Anthology
 Dreaming America: Voices of Undocumented Youth in Maximum-Security Detention (2017)

References

External links
 Website

Living people
Sarah Lawrence College alumni
Washington and Lee University faculty
21st-century American poets
1975 births
Johns Hopkins University alumni
University of Southern California alumni
American male poets
21st-century American male writers
American translators